Matt Hill (born 1968) is a Canadian voice actor.

Matt Hill may also refer to:
Matt Hill (businessman) (born 1970), Australian CEO of Globe International and film producer and director
Matt Hill (American football) (born 1978), American football player
Matt Hill (footballer) (born 1981), English footballer
Matthew Hill (footballer, born 1915), English footballer
Matt Hill (golfer) (born 1988), Canadian golfer
Matt Hill (musician) (born 1985), American blues musician
Matthew Hill (judoka) (born 1976), Australian judoka, member of the Hill family
Matthew Hill (born 1978), American religious broadcaster and member of the Tennessee House of Representatives
Matthew Davenport Hill (1792–1872), English lawyer and penologist
Matthew W. Hill (1894–1989), American lawyer and judge

In fiction
Matt Hill (EastEnders), a fictional character in a UK soap opera, EastEnders